National Democratic Union (ΕΔΕ) was a Greek political party. The party was founded in 1974 by Petros Garoufalias, a former member of the Centre Union. The party was founded in order to represent the royalists and supporters of the recently deposed junta. 

It participated in the 1974 Greek legislative election and gained  1.08%. After the electoral failure, the party dissolved.

Defunct nationalist parties in Greece
Political parties established in 1974
1974 establishments in Greece
Far-right parties in Europe
1977 disestablishments in Greece